General Government chess championships (Schachmeisterschaft des Generalgouvernements) were Nazi tournaments held during World War II in occupied central Poland. Hans Frank, the Governor-General of General Government, was the patron of those tournaments because he was an avid chess player.
The competition began when he organized a chess congress in Krakow on 3 November 1940. Six months later Frank announced the establishment of a chess school under Chess grandmasters, Yefim Bogolyubov and Alexander Alekhine.

Historical context 
A number of Polish chess players was arrested in January 1940. Jewish players were killed  by Germans, e.g. Dawid Przepiórka. Ethnic Poles didn't participate in the tournaments.

Participants 

Alexander Alekhine Russia/France
Efim Bogoljubow Ukraine/Germany
Paul Felix Schmidt Estonia/Germany
Klaus Junge Chile/Germany
Karl Gilg Czechoslovakia/Germany
Josef Lokvenc Austria/Germany
Hans Müller Austria/Germany
Wolfgang Weil Austria/Germany
Paul Mross Poland/Germany
Teodor Regedziński Poland/Germany
Leon Tuhan-Baranowski Poland/Germany
Fedir Bohatyrchuk Ukraine/Soviet Union

and other German players /Germany.

Regedziński played as Theodore Reger, and Tuhan-Baranowski as Lisse.

Krakow / Krynica / Warsaw 1940
The first General Government Championship was held in Krakow/Krynica/Warsaw in 3–17 November 1940.

{|class="wikitable" style="margin: 1em auto 1em auto; "
|  style="background:#f0f0f0;"|# 
|  style="background:#f0f0f0;"|Player
|  style="background:#f0f0f0;"|1
|  style="background:#f0f0f0;"|2
|  style="background:#f0f0f0;"|3
|  style="background:#f0f0f0;"|4
|  style="background:#f0f0f0;"|5
|  style="background:#f0f0f0;"|6
|  style="background:#f0f0f0;"|7
|  style="background:#f0f0f0;"|8
|  style="background:#f0f0f0;"|9
|  style="background:#f0f0f0;"|10
|  style="background:#f0f0f0;"|11
|  style="background:#f0f0f0;"|12
|  style="background:#f0f0f0;"|Total
|-
| 1||Anton Kohler||x||½ ||½ ||½ ||½ ||1 ||1 ||½ ||1 ||1 ||1 ||0 ||7½
|-
| 2||Efim Bogoljubow||½ ||x||½ ||½ ||0 ||½ ||1 ||1 ||½ ||1 ||1 ||1 ||7½
|-
| 3||Kurt Richter||½ ||½ ||x||½ ||1 ||½ ||0 ||1 ||1 ||1 ||½ ||½ ||7
|-
| 4||Josef Lokvenc||½ ||½ ||½ ||x||1 ||0 ||½ ||0 ||½ ||1 ||½ ||1 ||6
|-
| 5||Paul Mross||½ ||1 ||0 ||0 ||x||1 ||1 ||0 ||½ ||0 ||½ ||1 ||5½
|-
| 6||Hans Müller||0 ||½ ||½ ||1 ||0 ||x||½ ||½ ||½ ||½ ||1 ||½ ||5½
|-
| 7||Max Blümich||0 ||0 ||1 ||½ ||0 ||½ ||x||1 ||½ ||½ ||1 ||½ ||5½
|-
| 8||Carl Ahues||½ ||0 ||0 ||1 ||1 ||½ ||0 ||x||½ ||½ ||1 ||½ ||5½
|-
| 9||Karl Gilg||0 ||½ ||0 ||½ ||½ ||½ ||½ ||½ ||x||½ ||½ ||½ ||4½
|-
| 10||Georg Kieninger||0 ||0 ||0 ||0 ||1 ||½ ||½ ||½ ||½ ||x||0 ||1 ||4
|-
| 11||Ludwig Rellstab||0 ||0 ||½ ||½ ||½ ||0 ||0 ||0 ||½ ||1 ||x||1 ||4
|-
| 12||Max Eisinger||1 ||0 ||½ ||0 ||0 ||½ ||½ ||½ ||½ ||0 ||0 || x||3½
|-
|}

Krakow / Warsaw 1941
The second General Government Championship was held in Krakow/Warsaw in 5–19 October 1941.

{|class="wikitable" style="margin: 1em auto 1em auto; "
|  style="background:#f0f0f0;"|# 
|  style="background:#f0f0f0;"|Player
|  style="background:#f0f0f0;"|1
|  style="background:#f0f0f0;"|2
|  style="background:#f0f0f0;"|3
|  style="background:#f0f0f0;"|4
|  style="background:#f0f0f0;"|5
|  style="background:#f0f0f0;"|6
|  style="background:#f0f0f0;"|7
|  style="background:#f0f0f0;"|8
|  style="background:#f0f0f0;"|9
|  style="background:#f0f0f0;"|10
|  style="background:#f0f0f0;"|11
|  style="background:#f0f0f0;"|12
|  style="background:#f0f0f0;"|Total
|-
| 1||Alexander Alekhine||x||1 ||1 ||½ ||½ ||1 ||1 ||½ ||1 ||½ ||½ ||1 ||8½
|-
| 2||Paul Felix Schmidt||0 ||x||1 ||½ ||1 ||1 ||0 ||1 ||1 ||1 ||1 ||1 ||8½
|-
| 3||Efim Bogoljubow||0 ||0 ||x||½ ||½ ||1 ||½ ||1 ||1 ||1 ||1 ||1 ||7½
|-
| 4||Klaus Junge||½ ||½ ||½ ||x||½ ||1 ||½ ||½ ||1 ||½ ||½ ||1 ||7
|-
| 5||Josef Lokvenc||½ ||0 ||½ ||½ ||x||0 ||½ ||½ ||½ ||½ ||1 ||1 ||5½
|-
| 6||Teodor Regedziński||0 ||0 ||0 ||0 ||1 ||x||0 ||1 ||0 ||1 ||1 ||1 ||5
|-
| 7||Georg Kieninger||0 ||1 ||½ ||½ ||½ ||1 ||x||½ ||0 ||½ ||0 ||0 ||4½
|-
| 8||Eduard Hahn||½ ||0 ||0 ||½ ||½ ||0 ||½ ||x||1 ||1 ||½ ||0 ||4½
|-
| 9||Max Blümich||0 ||0 ||0 ||0 ||½ ||1 ||1 ||0 ||x||½ ||1 ||½ ||4½
|-
| 10||Carl Carls||½ ||0 ||0 ||½ ||½ ||0 ||½ ||0 ||½ ||x||1 ||0 ||3½
|-
| 11||Heinz Nowarra||½ ||0 ||0 ||½ ||0 ||0 ||1 ||½ ||0 ||0 ||x||1 ||3½
|-
| 12||Paul Mross||0 ||0 ||0 ||0 ||0 ||0 ||1 ||1 ||½ ||1 ||0 || x||3½
|-
|}

Warsaw / Lublin / Krakow 1942
The third General Government Championship was held in Warsaw/Lublin/Krakow in 11–24 October 1942.

{|class="wikitable" style="margin: 1em auto 1em auto; "
|  style="background:#f0f0f0;"|# 
|  style="background:#f0f0f0;"|Player
|  style="background:#f0f0f0;"|1
|  style="background:#f0f0f0;"|2
|  style="background:#f0f0f0;"|3
|  style="background:#f0f0f0;"|4
|  style="background:#f0f0f0;"|5
|  style="background:#f0f0f0;"|6
|  style="background:#f0f0f0;"|7
|  style="background:#f0f0f0;"|8
|  style="background:#f0f0f0;"|9
|  style="background:#f0f0f0;"|10
|  style="background:#f0f0f0;"|11
|  style="background:#f0f0f0;"|Total
|-
| 1||Alexander Alekhine||x||1 ||0 ||½ ||½ ||½ ||1 ||1 ||1 ||1 ||1 ||7½
|-
| 2||Klaus Junge||0 ||x||½ ||½ ||1 ||1 ||0 ||½ ||1 ||1 ||1 ||6½
|-
| 3||Efim Bogoljubow||1 ||½ ||x||1 ||½ ||1 ||1 ||0 ||½ ||0 ||½ ||6
|-
| 4||Fritz Sämisch||½ ||½ ||0 ||x||1 ||0 ||1 ||½ ||½ ||1 ||½ ||5½
|-
| 5||Rudolf Keller||½ ||0 ||½ ||0 ||x||1 ||0 ||1 ||½ ||1 ||1 ||5½
|-
| 6||Georg Kieninger||½ ||0 ||0 ||1 ||0 ||x||1 ||0 ||½ ||1 ||1 ||5
|-
| 7||Alfred Brinckmann||0 ||1 ||0 ||0 ||1 ||0 ||x||½ ||½ ||1 ||½ ||4½
|-
| 8||Werner Kunerth||0 ||½ ||1 ||½ ||0 ||1 ||½ ||x||½ ||0 ||0 ||4
|-
| 9||Wolfgang Weil||0 ||0 ||½ ||½ ||½ ||½ ||½ ||½ ||x||0 ||1 ||4
|-
| 10||Hans Roepstorff||0 ||0 ||1 ||0 ||0 ||0 ||0 ||1 ||1 ||x||1 ||4
|-
| 11||Hans Zollner||0 ||0 ||½ ||½ ||0 ||0 ||½ ||1 ||0 ||0 ||x||2½
|-
|}

Krynica 1943
The fourth General Government Championship was held in Krynica in 25 November–5 December 1943.

{|class="wikitable" style="margin: 1em auto 1em auto; "
|  style="background:#f0f0f0;"|# 
|  style="background:#f0f0f0;"|Player
|  style="background:#f0f0f0;"|1
|  style="background:#f0f0f0;"|2
|  style="background:#f0f0f0;"|3
|  style="background:#f0f0f0;"|4
|  style="background:#f0f0f0;"|5
|  style="background:#f0f0f0;"|6
|  style="background:#f0f0f0;"|7
|  style="background:#f0f0f0;"|8
|  style="background:#f0f0f0;"|9
|  style="background:#f0f0f0;"|10
|  style="background:#f0f0f0;"|Total
|-
| 1||Josef Lokvenc||x||0 ||½ ||1 ||1 ||1 ||1 ||1 ||1 ||1 ||7½
|-
| 2||Wilhelm Kuppe||1 ||x||0 ||½ ||½ ||1 ||1 ||1 ||1 ||½ ||6½
|-
| 3||Efim Bogoljubow||½ ||1 ||x||0 ||½ ||1 ||½ ||1 ||1 ||1 ||6½
|-
| 4||Georg Klaus||0 ||½ ||1 ||x||1 ||0 ||0 ||0 ||1 ||1 ||4½
|-
| 5||Leon Tuhan-Baranowski||0 ||½ ||½ ||0 ||x||0 ||0 ||1 ||1 ||1 ||4
|-
| 6||Hans Roepstorff||0 ||0 ||0 ||1 ||1 ||x||1 ||0 ||1 ||1 ||4
|-
| 7||Edith Keller||0 ||0 ||½ ||1 ||1 ||0 ||x||0 ||0 ||1 ||3½
|-
| 8||Heinz Nowarra||0 ||0 ||0 ||1 ||0 ||1 ||1 ||x||0 ||½ ||3½
|-
| 9||Egon Gilles||0 ||0 ||0 ||0 ||0 ||1 ||1 ||1 ||x||0 ||3
|-
| 10||Franz Herzog||0 ||½ ||0 ||0 ||0 ||0 ||0 ||½ ||1 ||x||2
|-
|}

Radom 1944
The fifth General Government Championship was held in Radom in February 1944.

{|class="wikitable" style="margin: 1em auto 1em auto; "
|  style="background:#f0f0f0;"|# 
|  style="background:#f0f0f0;"|Player
|  style="background:#f0f0f0;"|1
|  style="background:#f0f0f0;"|2
|  style="background:#f0f0f0;"|3
|  style="background:#f0f0f0;"|4
|  style="background:#f0f0f0;"|5
|  style="background:#f0f0f0;"|6
|  style="background:#f0f0f0;"|7
|  style="background:#f0f0f0;"|8
|  style="background:#f0f0f0;"|9
|  style="background:#f0f0f0;"|10
|  style="background:#f0f0f0;"|Total
|-
| 1||Efim Bogoljubow||x||½ ||1 ||1 ||1 ||1 ||1 ||1 ||1 ||1 ||8½
|-
| 2||Fedir Bohatyrchuk||½ ||x||½ ||1 ||1 ||1 ||1 ||1 ||1 ||1 ||8
|-
| 3||Hans Roepstorff||0 ||½ ||x||1 ||1 ||1 ||1 ||1 ||1 ||1 ||7½
|-
| 4||Leon Tuhan-Baranowski||0 ||0 ||0 ||x||½ ||½ ||1 ||1 ||1 ||1 ||5
|-
| 5||Franz Herzog||0 ||0 ||0 ||½ ||x||0 ||1 ||1 ||1 ||1 ||4½
|-
| 6||Planck||0 ||0 ||0 ||½ ||1 ||x||0 ||1 ||1 ||1 ||4½
|-
| 7||Heinz Nowarra||0 ||0 ||0 ||0 ||0 ||1 ||x||1 ||1 ||1 ||4
|-
| 8||Probst||0 ||0 ||0 ||0 ||0 ||0 ||0 ||x||1 ||1 ||2
|-
| 9||Sänger||0 ||0 ||0 ||0 ||0 ||0 ||0 ||0 ||x||1 ||1
|-
| 10||Meckel||0 ||0 ||0 ||0 ||0 ||0 ||0 ||0 ||0 ||x||0
|-
|}

References

See also 
Football in occupied Poland (1939–45)

Chess competitions
Chess in Poland
General Government
1940 in chess
1941 in chess
1942 in chess
1943 in chess
1944 in chess
Recurring sporting events established in 1940
Recurring sporting events disestablished in 1944
Poland in World War II
1940 establishments in Poland
1944 disestablishments in Poland